The Robert E. Lee tree is the second largest giant sequoia in the Grant Grove section of Kings Canyon National Park, and the eleventh largest giant sequoia in the world. Richard Field, a Confederate lieutenant, named this tree in honor of Robert E. Lee around 1875. In 2020, Sequoia and Kings Canyon National Parks removed references to the name in Park materials, in an effort to promote inclusiveness following the George Floyd protests; however, the name cannot be changed without the approval of Congress or the National Park Service.

Dimensions
Wendell Flint and Mike Law measured the tree in 1985 and found its volume to be .

See also
 List of largest giant sequoias
 List of individual trees

References

External links 
 The top 30 giant sequoias

Individual giant sequoia trees
Kings Canyon National Park
National symbols of the United States